Lewis Cyril Ashby Newnham (13 September 1881 – 20 November 1932) was a South African cricketer. He played in two first-class matches in 1903/04 and 1920/21. 

Newnham was a left-handed batsman and left-arm bowler. In his second first-class match, 17 years after his first, he took 3 for 14 off 9 overs in the second innings to help Transvaal to an innings victory over Orange Free State in the 1920-21 Currie Cup. At the age of 43 he scored 58, the highest score on either side in the two-day match, for a Pretoria side against S. B. Joel's XI, a team consisting largely of English Test cricketers, in November 1924.

Newnham was educated at Cranleigh School in England. He served as an officer in the Cape Corps in World War I. He married Constance Vera Lofthouse in Pretoria in March 1910; they had several children.

References

External links
 

1881 births
1932 deaths
People from Dr Beyers Naudé Local Municipality
People educated at Cranleigh School
South African cricketers
Border cricketers
Gauteng cricketers
South African military personnel of World War I